Newby Bridge Halt (also known, historically, as Newby Bridge Platform) is a railway station on the Lakeside and Haverthwaite heritage railway. It serves the village of Newby Bridge, Cumbria, England.

History
It was originally opened by the Furness Railway in 1905. Services were withdrawn in 1949, but trains continued to pass through the station until the line was closed by British Railways in 1965. Services were resumed eight years later under preservation.

Facilities

The station is an un-staffed halt, with a small waiting shelter in which historical photographs of the halt are displayed, illustrating its condition both before and after reopening. There is seating inside the shelter as well as on the platform.

A commemorative tree was planted at the station by Bishop Eric Treacy, during the re-opening ceremony of the line in 1973. The sapling is now a fully grown tree. The gardens are maintained by a local volunteer and are at their best in Spring with the daffodils and tulips in full bloom.

References

External links

Official Site
Furness Railway Trust

Former Furness Railway stations
Furness
Tourist attractions in Cumbria
Lakeside and Haverthwaite Railway
Railway stations in Great Britain opened in 1905
Railway stations in Great Britain closed in 1949
Railway stations in Great Britain opened in 1973
Heritage railway stations in Cumbria
Colton, Cumbria